Daniel Arnefjord (born 21 March 1979) is a Swedish footballer who last played for Aalesunds FK in the Norwegian Tippeligaen as a centre back.

Career
After several seasons in the lower divisions Arnefjord got his breakthrough after he was bought from FC Väsby United to AIK when AIK returned to Allsvenskan in 2006. A bitter moment in the 2006-season was a misunderstanding between Arnefjord and AIK's goalkeeper Daniel Örlund, which led to Arnefjord heading the ball into his one goal in the home-match against Helsingborgs IF. When the league finished two weeks later, AIK was only one point behind the league-winners IF Elfsborg, had Arnefjord let the goalkeeper make the save, AIK would have won the title.

Career statistics

References

External links
 Guardian Football

1979 births
Living people
Footballers from Stockholm
Aalesunds FK players
Allsvenskan players
AIK Fotboll players
Association football defenders
Swedish footballers
Swedish expatriate footballers
Expatriate footballers in Norway
Swedish expatriate sportspeople in Norway
Eliteserien players
AFC Eskilstuna players